Dewilde, DeWilde or deWilde  is a surname. Notable people with the surname include:

 Brandon deWilde, American actor
 Dom DeWilde, an alias of Don Preston
 Marius Dewilde, French railway worker who claimed to have been contacted by extraterrestrial life-forms

See also
 Wilde
 De Wilde